The 2016 Uzbekistan Cup is the 24th season of the annual Uzbek football Cup competition.  The competition started on 14 March 2016 and ended in November 2016.
The cup winner is guaranteed a place in the 2017 AFC Champions League.

Matches

First Round

Second round

Third round

1st Legs

2nd Legs

Kokand advance 2–1 on aggregate

Metallurg Bekabad advance 4–2 on aggregate

Mash'al Mubarek advance 2–1 on aggregate

Andijan advance 5–3 on aggregate

Bunyodkor advance 4–3 on aggregate

Nasaf advance 5–1 on aggregate

Bukhoro advance 2–0 on aggregate

Lokomotiv Tashkent advance 13–1 on aggregate

Quarter-finals

1st Legs

2nd Legs

FK Buxoro advance 3–1 on aggregate

Nasaf Qarshi advance 4–1 on aggregate

Lokomotiv Tashkent advance 5–3 on aggregate

Bunyodkor advance 3–1 on aggregate

Semi-finals

First legs

Secost legs

Nasaf Qarshi advance 4–1 on aggregate

Lokomotiv Tashkent advance 2–0 on aggregate

Final

References

Cup
Uzbekistan Cup
2016